The Company Worth Millions is a 1925 German silent film directed by Fred Sauer and starring Olaf Fjord, Olga Tschechowa and Colette Brettel.

Cast
 Olaf Fjord
 Olga Tschechowa
 Colette Brettel
 Ernst Winar
 Robert Garrison
 Frieda Lehndorf
 Hermann Picha

References

Bibliography
 Beevor, Antony. The Mystery of Olga Chekhova. Penguin, 2005.

External links

1925 films
Films of the Weimar Republic
German silent feature films
Films directed by Fred Sauer
German black-and-white films
1920s German films